Markovo is a rural locality (a village) in Simskoye Rural Settlement, Yuryev-Polsky District, Vladimir Oblast, Russia. The population was 20 as of 2010.

Geography 
Markovo is located 26 km northwest of Yuryev-Polsky (the district's administrative centre) by road. Sima is the nearest rural locality.

References 

Rural localities in Yuryev-Polsky District